Daniel Bauer (born 17 October 1982) is a German former professional footballer, and currently the assistant manager of Hannover 96 II.

Career 
Born in Andernach, West Germany, Bauer began his senior career at TuS Mayen in the then fifth-tier Verbandsliga Rheinland, winning promotion to tier IV in his first season. After the club finished 12th in the Oberliga Südwest, Bauer moved to 2. Bundesliga side SV Eintracht Trier 05 where he spent the next four years, playing in 26 2. Bundesliga matches and then ten Regionalliga Süd matches following Trier's relegation at the end of the 2004–05 season.

After his contract was not renewed following another relegation of Eintracht Trier, Bauer was unemployed for a while after injuring himself on the last day of his trial at 1. FC Union Berlin when he tore three ligaments in his ankle joint. Bauer was able to sign a contract with Union Berlin in the following winter and played in ten Regionalliga Nord games for the club. 

Bauer was not able to agree on a new contract with the club and was again unemployed until signing a contract with Finnish top-tier club RoPS. Here Bauer played in nine matches in the Veikkausliiga, but bad luck hit again when he broke his shoulder blade in June. Despite being highly valued in the league – Finnish sports magazine Urheilulehti ranked him eight-best foreign player – his contract was not renewed at the end of the season and Bauer faced unemployment again.

On 2 February 2009, Bauer signed a contract with Regionalliga Nord side 1. FC Magdeburg that will keep him at the club until June 2010. He later extended his contract until June 2011.

After Bauer was allegedly threatened by disgruntled fans of 1. FC Magdeburg, he dissolved his contract and joined SV Eintracht Trier 05 in early 2012, before moving on to VfB Oldenburg in the summer.

Managerial career

Hannover II
After retiring from football in the summer 2014, Bauer was hired as assistant manager of the reserve team of Hannover 96.

References 

1982 births
Living people
People from Andernach
German footballers
Footballers from Rhineland-Palatinate
Association football midfielders
TuS Mayen players
SV Eintracht Trier 05 players
Rovaniemen Palloseura players
1. FC Magdeburg players
1. FC Union Berlin players
VfB Oldenburg players
Hannover 96 II players
Veikkausliiga players
2. Bundesliga players
German expatriate footballers
German expatriate sportspeople in Finland
Expatriate footballers in Finland